The Ramey House, sometimes also called the Ramey–Grainger house, is a privately owned, early 20th-century Colonial Revival home and historic landmark located at 605 South Broadway Avenue in Tyler, Texas, occupying the southwest corner of Broadway Avenue and Houston Street. It was built in 1903 by its namesake, Thomas Brown Ramey, who was a Tyler businessman and jeweler. Ramey and his wife, Mary Josephine Ramey (née Spencer), were well known locally for their civic engagement and public commitments.

The 118-year-old structure is listed on the National Register of Historic Places and is designated as a Recorded Texas Historic Landmark by the Texas Historical Commission. The property itself is part of the Brick Streets Neighborhood Historic District and has, since 2004, been recognized as a contributing property there. The historical significance of the Ramey House is primarily architectural in nature.

The interior of the house was extensively renovated in 1935 under the purview of prominent Texas architect Shirley Simons (1897–1963).  The Ramey House was converted into law offices in the early 1980s, during which time its exterior underwent a restoration process from 1980 to 1981. It was subsequently also known as Grainger and Petterson Law Offices, though it is no longer used as a law firm.

In 1982, the house gained official status as a historic landmark when it was listed on the National Register of Historic Places. The listing included one contributing building and one contributing site.

Today, the Ramey House functions as the headquarters of Stonewater Roofing, which completed another restoration of the house in 2021 after it had fallen into moderate disrepair over several years. Like earlier renovations and restorations of the house, the 2021 restoration honors and preserves the historic integrity of the structure.

On October 29, 2022 a fire broke out at the Ramey House that partially engulfed the second floor and attic space. An investigation is still ongoing into the cause of the fire.

See also

National Register of Historic Places listings in Smith County, Texas
Recorded Texas Historic Landmarks in Smith County

References

Houses on the National Register of Historic Places in Texas
Colonial Revival architecture in Texas
Houses completed in 1903
Buildings and structures in Tyler, Texas
Houses in Smith County, Texas
National Register of Historic Places in Smith County, Texas
Recorded Texas Historic Landmarks